2002–03 Croatian First League was the 12th season of the Croatian handball league since its independence and the second season of the First League format.

League table

Relegation play-offs

Sources 
 Fredi Kramer, Dražen Pinević: Hrvatski rukomet = Croatian handball, Zagreb, 2009.; page 180
 hrt.hr ljestvica i rezultati 2002./03.

References

2002-03
handball
handball
Croatia